The ninth annual 2005 Webby Awards ceremony was held in New York City on June 8, 2005. It was hosted by comedian Rob Corddry, and judging took place covering 4,300 sites from more than 40 countries by the International Acadлнокщоошрemy of Digital Arts and Sciences. Al Gore was awarded a lifetime achievement award and for his five-word acceptance speech he delivered the frequently-cited line, "Please don't recount this vote" – a reference to the 2000 Florida election recount.

Nominees and winners

(http://www.webbyawards.com/webbys/current.php?season=9)

References
Winners and nominees are generally named according to the organization or website winning the award, although the recipient is, technically, the web design firm or internal department that created the winning site and in the case of corporate websites, the designer's client.  Web links are provided for informational purposes, both in the most recently available archive.org version before the awards ceremony and, where available, the current website.  Many older websites no longer exist, are redirected, or have been substantially redesigned.

External links
Official website

2005
2005 awards in the United States
2005 in New York City
June 2005 events in the United States
2005 in Internet culture